The foreign relations of Finland are the responsibility of the president of Finland, who leads foreign policy in cooperation with the government. Implicitly the government is responsible for internal policy and decision making in the European Union. Within the government, preparative discussions are conducted in the government committee of foreign and security policy (ulko- ja turvallisuuspoliittinen ministerivaliokunta), which includes the Prime Minister and at least the Minister of Foreign Affairs and the Minister of Defence, and at most four other ministers as necessary. The committee meets with the President as necessary. Laws concerning foreign relations are discussed in the parliamentary committee of foreign relations (ulkoasiainvaliokunta, utrikesutskottet). The Ministry of Foreign Affairs implements the foreign policy.

During the Cold War, Finland's foreign policy was based on official neutrality between the Western powers and the Soviet Union, while simultaneously stressing Nordic cooperation in the framework of the Nordic Council and cautious economic integration with the West as promoted by the Bretton-Woods Agreement and the free trade treaty with the European Economic Community. Finland shares this history with close neighbour Sweden, which Finland was a part of until the split of the Swedish empire in 1809. Finland did not join the Soviet Union's economic sphere (Comecon) but remained a free-market economy and conducted bilateral trade with the Soviet Union. After the dissolution of the Soviet Union in 1991, Finland unilaterally abrogated the last restrictions imposed on it by the Paris peace treaties of 1947 and the Finno-Soviet Agreement of Friendship, Cooperation, and Mutual Assistance. The government filed an application for membership in the European Union (EU) three months after the dissolution of the Soviet Union and became a member in 1995. Finland did not attempt to join NATO, even though post-Soviet countries on the Baltic Sea and elsewhere joined. Nevertheless, defence policymakers have quietly converted to NATO equipment and contributed troops.

President Martti Ahtisaari and the coalition governments led Finland closer to the core EU in the late 1990s. Finland was considered a cooperative model state, and Finland did not oppose proposals for a common EU defence policy. This was reversed in the 2000s, when Tarja Halonen and Erkki Tuomioja made Finland's official policy to resist other EU members' plans for common defense. However, Halonen allowed Finland to join European Union Battlegroups in 2006 and the NATO Response Force in 2008.

Relations with Russia are cordial and common issues include bureaucracy (particularly at the Vaalimaa border crossing), airspace violations, development aid Finland gives to Russia (especially in environmental problems that affect Finland), and Finland's energy dependency on Russian gas and electricity. Behind the scenes, the administration witnessed a resurrection of Soviet-era tactics as recently as 2017. The Finnish Security Intelligence Service, the nation's security agency, says the known number of Russian agents from Foreign Intelligence Service (SVR) and GRU now exceeds Cold War levels and there are unknown numbers of others. Russian Foreign Ministry spokeswoman Maria Zakharova said in March 2022 that her government would have to respond if Finland became a NATO member.

As of March 2011 Finland maintains diplomatic relations with all UN member states.

History

After independence from Russia in 1917, the Finnish Civil War, including interventions by Imperial Germany and Soviet Russia, and failure of the Communist revolution, resulted in the official ban on Communism, and strengthening relations with Western countries. Overt alliance with Germany was not possible due to the result of the First World War, but in general the period of 1918 to 1939 was characterised by economic growth and increasing integration to the Western world economy. Relations with Soviet Russia from 1918 to 1939 were icy; voluntary expeditions to Russia called heimosodat ended only in 1922, four years after the conclusion of the Finnish Civil War. However, attempts to establish military alliances were unsuccessful. Thus, when the Winter War broke out, Finland was left alone to resist the Soviet attack. Later, during the Continuation War, Finland declared "co-belligerency" with Nazi Germany, and allowed Northern Finland to be used as a German attack base. For 872 days, the German army, aided indirectly by Finnish forces, besieged Leningrad, the Soviet Union's second-largest city. The peace settlement in 1944 with the Soviet Union led to the Lapland War in 1945, where Finland fought Germans in northern Finland.

From the end of the Continuation War with the Soviet Union in 1944 until 1991, the policy was to avoid superpower conflicts and to build mutual confidence with the Western powers and the Soviet Union. Although the country was culturally, socially, and politically Western, Finns realised they had to live in peace with the Soviets and so could take no action that might be interpreted as a security threat. The dissolution of the Soviet Union in 1991 opened up dramatic new possibilities for Finland and has resulted in the Finns actively seeking greater participation in Western political and economic structures. The popular support for the strictly self-defensive doctrine remains.

2000 constitution
In the 2000 constitution, where diverse constitutional laws were unified into one statute, the leading role of the President was slightly moderated. However, because the constitution still stipulates only that the President leads foreign policy and the government internal policy, the responsibility over European Union affairs is not explicitly resolved. Implicitly this belongs to the powers of the government. In a cohabitation situation as with Matti Vanhanen's recent second government right-wing government and left-wing President Tarja Halonen, there can be friction between government ministers and the president.

The arrangement has been criticised by Risto E. J. Penttilä for not providing a simple answer of who's in charge.

Multilateral relations

Finnish foreign policy emphasises its participation in multilateral organisations. Finland joined the United Nations in 1955 and the European Union in 1995. As noted, the country also is a member of NATO's Partnership for Peace as well as an observer in the Euro-Atlantic Partnership Council. The military has been prepared to be more compatible with NATO, as co-operation with NATO in peacekeeping is needed, but military alliance does not have popular support. Political scientist Teija Tiilikainen has attributed tensions like this one to the importance that Finland's political identity places on sovereignty and the (sometimes competing) stress it places on international cooperation.

In the European Union, Finland is a member of the Eurozone, and in addition, the Schengen treaty abolishing passport controls. 60% of foreign trade is to the EU. Other large trade partners are Russia and the United States.

Finland is well represented in the UN civil service in proportion to its population and belongs to several of its specialised and related agencies. Finnish troops have participated in United Nations peacekeeping activities since 1956, and the Finns continue to be one of the largest per capita contributors of peacekeepers in the world. Finland is an active participant in the Organization for Security and Cooperation in Europe (OSCE) and in early 1995 assumed the co-chairmanship of the OSCE's Minsk Group on the Nagorno-Karabakh conflict.

Cooperation with the other Scandinavian countries also is important to Finland, and it has been a member of the Nordic Council since 1955. Under the council's auspices, the Nordic countries have created a common labor market and have abolished immigration controls among themselves. The council also serves to coordinate social and cultural policies of the participating countries and has promoted increased cooperation in many fields.

In addition to the organisations already mentioned, Finland is a member of the International Bank for Reconstruction and Development, the International Monetary Fund, the World Trade Organization, the International Finance Corporation, the International Development Association, the Bank for International Settlements, the Asian Development Bank, the Inter-American Development Bank, the Council of Europe, and the Organisation for Economic Co-operation and Development.

Following the dissolution of the Soviet Union, Finland has moved steadily towards integration into Western institutions and abandoned its formal policy of neutrality, which has been recast as a policy of military nonalliance coupled with the maintenance of a credible, independent defence. Finland's 1994 decision to buy 64 F-18 Hornet fighter planes from the United States signalled the abandonment of the country's policy of balanced arms purchases from Communist countries and Western countries.

In 1994, Finland joined NATO's Partnership for Peace; the country is also an observer in the North Atlantic Cooperation Council. Finland became a full member of the EU in January 1995, at the same time acquiring observer status in the EU's defence arm, the Western European Union.

In 2003, Anneli Jäätteenmäki of the Centre Party won the elections after she had accused her rival Paavo Lipponen, who was prime minister at the time, of allying neutral Finland with the United States in the war in Iraq during a meeting with President George W. Bush, and thus associated Finland with what many Finns considered an illegal war of aggression. Lipponen denied the claims and declared that "We support the UN and the UN Secretary-General." Jäätteenmäki resigned as prime minister after 63 days in office amid accusations that she had lied about the leak of the documents about the meeting between Bush and Lipponen. This series of events was considered scandalous and it is named Iraq leak or Iraq-gate.

Generally, Finland has abided by the principle of neutrality and has good relations with nearly all countries, as evidenced by the freedom of travel that a Finnish passport gives; though relations with Russia remain strained and are often tense due to past historical grievances, including Russian threats and past invasion.

Diplomatic relations list

Finland has established diplomatic relations with all United Nations member states, plus the Holy See and Kosovo.

Multilateral

Africa

Americas

Asia

Europe

Oceania

International organization participation

AfDB
AsDB
Australia Group
BIS
CBSS
CCC
CE
CERN
EAPC
EBRD
ECE
EIB
ESA

 FAO
G-9
IADB
 IAEA
IBRD
 ICAO
ICC
 ICC
 ICRM
IDA
IEA
IFAD
IFC
 IFRCS
IHO
 ILO
IMF
 IMO
ITUC
Interpol

IOM
ISO
ITU
MINURSO
NAM (guest)
 NC
NEA
 NIB
NSG
 OAS (observer)
OECD
OPCW
 OSCE
 PCA
PFP

UNCTAD
 UNESCO
 UNHCR
UNIDO
UNIKOM
UNITAR
UNMEE
UNMIBH
UNMIK
UNMOGIP
UNMOP
UNOMIG
UNTAET
UNTSO
 UPU
 WEU (observer)
WFTU
 WHO
WIPO
 WMO
WTrO
Zangger Committee

See also
List of diplomatic missions in Finland
Ministry for Foreign Affairs (Finland)
Politics of Finland
Pulp mill conflict between Argentina and Uruguay (for the ongoing conflict over the installation of a pulp mill by the Finnish company Botnia in Uruguay, across the Uruguay River)
Visa requirements for Finnish citizens
Arctic policy of Finland

References

External links
Finland in the CIA World Factbook
A Eurosceptic big bang: Finland's EU policy in hindsight of the 2011 elections—The Finnish Institute of International Affairs
Finland in the United Nations: Consistent and Credible Constructivism —The Finnish Institute of International Affairs
From Cold War to Common Currency: A personal perspective on Finland and the EU —The Finnish Institute of International Affairs